DAC Air was an airline from Romania between 1995 and 1998.

External links

Defunct airlines of Romania
Airlines established in 1995
Airlines disestablished in 1998
Romanian companies established in 1995
1998 disestablishments in Romania